Hawthorn Mall, formerly Westfield Hawthorn, is a shopping mall in Vernon Hills, Illinois. It was developed by Urban Investment and Development Co, and anchor stores Sears and Marshall Field & Company (now Macy's) as part of New Century Town, a community with 5,000 condominiums and townhomes planned at the time. Current anchor stores are AMC Theatres, Dave & Buster's, JCPenney, and Macy's with one vacant anchor last occupied by Carson's.

History
Construction of the mall began in May 1972 and was completed at a cost of $45 million. By September 10, 1973, the building was complete and the first stores – Marshall Field & Company, Sears, Lord & Taylor and fifteen specialty shops – had their grand opening. Hawthorn was originally constructed without a food court. In 1990, Lord & Taylor sold its store to Carson Pirie Scott. In 1997, more stores began to come into the mall, including Barnes & Noble and JCPenney, which was constructed on the north end of the mall to replace the shuttered location at the failing Lakehurst Mall in Waukegan. In 1999, Holiday Inn Express opened outside the mall.

The mall was acquired by Westfield Group in 2002. Dave & Buster's opened on March 26, 2014. Maggiano's Little Italy opened on July 21, 2014. AMC Theatres opened in the spring of 2015. Westfield Group sold 80% interest in mall as of December 2015. Anchor stores include JCPenney, Macy's, AMC Theatres, Barbara's Bookstore, and Dave & Buster's. On April 18, 2018, it was announced that Carson's and Carson's Furniture Gallery would both be closing as parent company The Bon-Ton is going out of business. The store closed in August 2018. On May 31, 2018, Sears announced that it would also close its Hawthorn Mall location along with 71 other stores across the country. The store closed in September 2018. Barnes & Noble announced it would be closing its Hawthorn Mall location in favor of the new development, Mellody Farm. The new location opened September 28, 2018. Not long after, Barbara's Bookstore moved into a space near the space formerly occupied by Barnes & Noble. In January 2021, demolition of the vacant Sears building began to facilitate a new "main street" development with apartments and restaurants.

Bus routes 
Pace

  272 Milwaukee Avenue North  
  574 CLC/Hawthorn Mall

References

External links
 
 

Vernon Hills, Illinois
Shopping malls in Lake County, Illinois
Shopping malls established in 1973
1973 establishments in Illinois